Hardo Aasmäe (11 February 1951 – 2 December 2014) was an Estonian geographer, entrepreneur and politician.

He was active in the Estonian People's Front, and was the first post-Soviet mayor of Tallinn, from 1990 to 1992.

He was for many years the editor-in-chief of the Estonian Encyclopaedia.

Aasmäe produced many radio shows and was a member of Tarkade klubi, an Estonian question-and-answer radio programme, for many years.

He was a member of Club of Rome Estonian section.

Death
On 2 December 2014, Aasmäe died following an accidental fall down a staircase from the third floor of his office at the Estonian Encyclopedia publishing house in Tallinn.

Awards
3rd Class of the Order of the National Coat of Arms (received 23 February 2006)

References

1951 births
2014 deaths
People from Lääne-Nigula Parish
Estonian geographers
Mayors of Tallinn
University of Tartu alumni
Recipients of the Order of the National Coat of Arms, 3rd Class
Accidental deaths in Estonia
Accidental deaths from falls
Burials at Metsakalmistu
20th-century Estonian politicians
Estonian publishers (people)